X-55 is an Armenian unmanned aerial vehicle (UAV) in service with the Armed Forces of Armenia.

History 
Firstly X-55 was presented at an exhibition of Armenian defence industry on 23 March 2015. As of April 2015 little is known about the X-55. It is one of four Armenian UAVs made by the Defence Industry. The previous showed UAV was Krunk, Baze, Azniv

Azerbaijan has released claims of shooting down several Armenian X-55 drones.

Specifications  
Crew: 0 (unmanned)
Maximum takeoff weight: 50kg
Max speed: 130 km/h
Cruising speed: 100 km/h
Ceiling: 4500m
Range: 320km
Length: 1880mm
Wing Span: 2620mm
Height: 940mm

Service
 - Armed Forces of Armenia
 - Artsakh Defense Army

See also 

 Category:Unmanned aerial vehicles of Armenia

References

Armenian inventions
Unmanned military aircraft of Armenia